The Big Heart of Girls is a 2011 Italian drama film directed by Pupi Avati.

Cast
 Cesare Cremonini as Carlino Vigetti
 Micaela Ramazzotti as Francesca Osti
 Gianni Cavina as Sisto Osti
 Erika Blanc as Eugenia Vigetti (as Erica Blanc)
 Manuela Morabito as Rosalia Osti
 Gisella Sofio as Olimpia Osti
 Massimo Bonetti as Umberto Vigetti
 Isabelle Adriani as Marcella Vanarini
 Sydne Rome as Enrichetta

References

External links
 

2011 films
2011 drama films
Italian drama films
2010s Italian-language films
Films directed by Pupi Avati
2010s Italian films